Francis Joseph Davidson  (12 January 1934 − 22 July 2022) was an Australian entertainer who had several hit records in the 1960s, appeared on many TV variety shows, and acted in several Australian television police dramas, including Matlock Police and Bluey, as well as guest roles in soap operas including A Country Practice, E Street and Home and Away and a small role in film Muriel's Wedding.

Career
Davidson was born in Black Rock, a suburb of Melbourne, Victoria.

While undergoing compulsory National Service training, he sang to entertain fellow recruits, and was an early adopter of the rock 'n' roll idiom. In 1959 he signed to W&G Records, and in 1960 found success with his single I Care for You.

His next success was a comedy song "Yabba Dabba Doo" (referencing the Flintstones catchphrase) in 1961, followed by "Have You Ever Been to See Kings Cross" in 1962, a humorous ditty sung at breakneck speed in Australian vernacular, which became a best-seller. Other comic songs followed: "Hector the Trash Collector", a spoof on John Farnham's hit "Sadie (The Cleaning Lady)", and "50 Million Blowflies Can't Be Wrong".
In 1963, he won first prize in Export Talent, an Australia's Got Talent–type contest, which sent him to England, giving him valuable overseas exposure and experience. He returned to Australia in 1965, but over the next five years he spent much time performing in Europe and America, where he appeared on The Dick Clark Show. In 1970, he made two further comic songs in a country and western vein: "Gimme Dat Ding" and "Ball Bearing Bird". He also acted in several Australian TV series, the best-known being Homicide and Matlock Police.

In 1975, he changed labels, to M7 Records (a project of the Macquarie Broadcasting Service, Herald and Weekly Times and ATN-7), for whom he recorded around a dozen singles, including "I Love a Sunburnt Football" in two versions—Australian rules and rugby league—and "I Hope Your Chooks Turn into Emus (and Kick Your Dunny Down)". They also released his album, A Generation of Children's Hits, which included covers of "The Candy Man", "Rubber Duckie", "Three Little Fishies", "Puff, the Magic Dragon", "All I Want for Christmas Is My Two Front Teeth", "Any Dream Will Do", "The Ugly Duckling" also "Little White Bull" and "What a Mouth", two Tommy Steele classics.

In 1981, he released on Big Aussie BBQ, an album of familiar Australian songs, including the Slim Dusty favourite "Duncan", the traditional songs "Wild Colonial Boy" and "The Man from Snowy River", Peter Allen's "I Still Call Australia Home", and Joe Dolce's irreverent "Shaddap You Face".

Discography

Charting albums

Charting singles

Filmography

Awards

Mo Awards
The Australian Entertainment Mo Awards (commonly known informally as the Mo Awards), were annual Australian entertainment industry awards. They recognise achievements in live entertainment in Australia from 1975 to 2016. Frankie Davidson won one award in that time.
 (wins only)
|-
| 1976
| Frankie Davidson
| Most Versatile Act of the Year
| 
|-

References

External links

 

1934 births
2022 deaths
Australian pop singers
Australian television actors
Musicians from Melbourne
Recipients of the Medal of the Order of Australia
People from Black Rock, Victoria
Male actors from Melbourne
20th-century Australian singers
20th-century Australian male actors